Inhuman Kiss, also known as Krasue: Inhuman Kiss, is a 2019 Thai supernatural horror film directed by Sitisiri Mongkolsiri. It was selected as the Thai entry for the Best International Feature Film at the 92nd Academy Awards, but was not nominated. In 1940s Thailand, a krasue lives a normal life by day, but at night her detached head seeks out flesh and blood.

Plot
The film starts with four children Jerd, Sai, Noi and Ting. They go to the forest to play hide and seek. Noi and Sai decide to hide inside the house that supposedly contains the spirit of a Krasue that protects the forest. Sai encounters a krasue inside the box she decides to hide in. 
The scene is fast forwarded to the time when the four friends are in their teens. Sai and Jerd are in Thailand while Noi is in Bangkok pursuing his medical training. It is the time of World War II and all the nurses in Thailand have gone to Bangkok to care for the wounded which is why Sai goes to the local hospital to nurse the wounded. Jerd has a crush on her which is obvious to everyone except her.

She meets Noi at the forest and reunites with him. A new love is rekindled between them. It is revealed that Noi and the tribe in his hometown have come to Sai's village to hunt down a krasue. The tribe leader tells everyone about how a female krasue can turn a female human into a krasue too while a male krasue (krahang) experiences severe pain in the initial stages of being a krahang where there is a high chance that a krasue can devour his guts.

She starts to see blood stains on her bed everyday which only gets bigger and darker with days. One day she screeches in pain and sees her head detached from her body, flying in the air. She has turned into a krasue. She goes outside her house to catch prey and eat. After getting enough meat she returns to her human form. Noi who witnesses this helps Sai get meat which makes them get closer. As a result of  this Sai starts to ignore Jerd.

It is later revealed that Jerd knew she was a krasue all along and had only joined the krasue hunting tribe to misdirect them. When the tribe leader (who is also a krahang) hears about Jerd's disloyalty he turns Jerd into a grotesque krahang. When Sai visits Jerd he begs her not to leave him as she had planned to run away with Noi to Bangkok that evening.

Sai's father takes her to a mass movie theater in the village borders to show everyone that the rumors about her turning into a krasue at night are false. 
The monk whose guidance Noi has been following all this while reveals that in the ancient time a krasue, wife of a krahang fell in love with a human who made her pregnant. The krahang who was furious killed both the Krasue and the human to avenge his broken heart. Thus, it is fate that every krahang shall fall in love with a krasue and kill her in the end by ripping her heart apart. This hints at the possibly that Jerd might kill Sai.
The villagers are shocked to see Sai turn into a krasue and start chasing her with guns. Meanwhile an angry Jerd comes at Sai to kill her. Noi convinces Jerd not to kill her as she was his friend before anything else. Jerd decided not to kill her but the angry tribe leader kills him and move to kill Sai too when he is killed by the monk.

It is revealed that the krasue who had turned Sai into a krasue was actually the wife of the monk who had helped Noi all these days. He had helped Noi because he was guilty of locking his wife in a box in the forest to prevent her death and didn't want the same thing to happen to Sai.
Sai and Noi run to the river from which they can reach Bangkok. But it's too late as her body has completely been destroyed by the villagers. Noi still has hopes of saving her as she still has her head. The happiness doesn't last long as Sai is shot dead in her head by Jerd's parents.

Cast
 Phantira Pipityakorn as Sai
 Oabnithi Wiwattanawarang as Noi
 Sapol Assawamunkong as Jerd
 Surasak Wongthai as Tad

Reception
Meagan Navarro of Bloody Disgusting recommended the film, writing: "Inhuman Kiss does run a bit overlong and has a measured pace, but it builds into an insane climax."

Sequel
A sequel to Inhuman Kiss, Inhuman Kiss 2 was completed in 2022 and is scheduled for theatrical release in Thailand on 30 March 2023.

See also
 List of submissions to the 92nd Academy Awards for Best International Feature Film
 List of Thai submissions for the Academy Award for Best International Feature Film

References

External links
 
 

2019 films
2019 horror films
Thai horror films
Thai-language films
Romantic horror films
Films set in the 1940s
Films set in Thailand